Microcotyle mouwoi is a species of monogenea, parasitic on the gills of a marine fish. It belongs to the family Microcotylidae.

Taxonomy
Microcotyle mouwoi was described from the gills of Epinephelus chlorostigma and Siganus fuscescens off Japan. It was placed in the new genus Solostamenides as Solostamenides mouwoi. 
As Microcotyle mouwoi differed significantly from Solostamenides spp. it could not be merged with them in one genus. Microcotyle mouwoi was also reported from Siganus sutor  Specimens of Microcotyle mouwoi from Siganus sutor were examined, a synonymie between Microcotyle mouwoi and Polylabris cf. mamaevi was suggested with the hypothesis that all (or most) microcotylids from Siganus spp. represent a single species. As the type specimens of M. mouwoi was not available for ex amination, the authors were reluctant to synonymize the two species.

Description
Microcotyle mouwoi has the general morphology of all species of Microcotyle, with a flat body comprising an anterior part which contains most organs and a posterior part called the haptor. The haptor is symmetrical and bears a number of clamps, arranged as two rows, one on each side. The clamps of the haptor attach the animal to the gill of the fish. There are also two small buccal suckers at the anterior extremity. The digestive organs include an anterior, terminal mouth, a muscular pharynx, and a posterior intestine with two lateral blind-ending branches. Each adult contains male and female reproductive organs. The reproductive organs include an anterior genital atrium, with spines, a dorsal vagina, a single ovary, and a number of testes which are posterior to the ovary.

The description by Ishii and Sawada in 1938 includes the following:
Two oval anterior suckers lies at the anterior end of the body.The haptor has 28-30 clamps. The mouth, which opens at the anterior end of the body leads into the pharynx. The pharynx lies in contact with two anterior suckers. The short oesophagus divides into two intestinal canals, which run to near the end of the haptor.
Male organs comprises testicular follicles, longitudinally on the median line at the posterior portion of the body. The vas deferens from testes winds on forward along the ovary, into the genital opening, which has four long spines. The female organs includes the elongated ovary with the slender end posterior and the broad anterior part to the right. The oviduct receives the vitelloduct and becomes the slender ootype. The uterus proceeds forward to the genital opening. The vitellaria fill up the lateral body from a little behind the genital opening to the end of the haptor. The vaginal opening lies median, dorsal and behind the genital opening."

Differential diagnosis
Microcotyle mouwoi resembles Microcotyle elegans,  but differs in the number of the testes and the clamps and also in the character of the atrial spines and the vitellaria.

Etymology
The species name mouwoi is after the Japanese name of the host fish, mouwo (Epinephelus chlorostigma).

Hosts and localities
The hosts are the brownspotted grouper Epinephelus chlorostigma (Serranidae) ("Mouwo" in Japanese) and the Mottled spinefoot Siganus fuscescens (Siganidae) ("Aigo" in Japanese). The type-locality is off Japan.
In the same paper, another species was described, Microcotyle aigoi, from Siganus fuscescens. Microcotyle mouwoi was also reported from the whitespotted rabbitfish, Siganus sutor off Kenya, and off Guam, Pacific ocean,

References 

Microcotylidae
Animals described in 1938
Parasites of fish
Fauna of Japan